The Eastern Illinois League was a Class-D league in Minor League Baseball that existed during the 1907 and 1908 baseball seasons.  The league president as of 1907 was L. A. G. Shoaff.  According to the 1908 Spalding Guide, the league got its start in Pana, IL and the league's "godfather" was Joe Adams, also known as "Old Wagon Tongue."  In 1907, teams had a salary limit of $600.

Cities Represented
Centralia, IL:  Centralia White Stockings 1907
Charleston, IL:  Charleston Broom Corn Cutters 1907; Charleston Evangelists 1908
Danville, IL:  Danville Speakers 1908
Linton, IN:  Linton 1908
Mattoon, IL:  Mattoon Giants 1907-1908
Pana, IL:  Pana Coal Miners 1907-1908
Paris, IL:  Paris Colts 1907; Paris Parisians 1908
Shelbyville, IL:  Shelbyville Queen Citys 1907-1908
Staunton, IL:  Staunton Speakers 1908
Taylorville, IL:  Taylorville Tailors 1907-1908
Vincennes, IN:  Vincennes Alices 1908

Standings & statistics

1907 Eastern Illinois League
President: Charles Welvert / L.A.G. Schoaff
Centralia (6-27) moved to Paris June 20.

1908 Eastern Illinois League
President: L.A.G. Schoaff 
#Pana (18-44) moved to Linton July 17, for the second half.Danville (42-18) moved to Staunton July 17, for the second half.Charleston and Mattoon disbanded July 30.Shelbyville disbanded August 20, causing the league to disband.

Sources
The Encyclopedia of Minor League Baseball:Second Edition.

References

External links
Baseball Reference

Defunct minor baseball leagues in the United States
Baseball leagues in Illinois
1907 establishments in Illinois
1908 disestablishments in Illinois
Sports leagues established in 1907
Sports leagues disestablished in 1908
Baseball leagues in Indiana